Nelson Strobridge Talbott III (born April 25, 1946) is an American foreign policy analyst focused on Russia. He was associated with Time magazine, and a diplomat who served as the Deputy Secretary of State from 1994 to 2001. He was president of Brookings Institution from 2002 to 2017.

Early life
Talbott was born in Dayton, Ohio, to Helen Josephine (Large) and Nelson Strobridge "Bud" Talbott II. He attended the Hotchkiss School in Connecticut and graduated in 1968 from Yale University, where he had been chairman of the Yale Daily News, a position whose previous incumbents include Henry Luce, William F. Buckley, and Joe Lieberman. He was awarded Yale's Alpheus Henry Snow Prize. He was also a member of the Scholar of the House program in 1967–68, belonged to a society of juniors and seniors called Saint Anthony Hall and elected to the exclusive Elizabethan Club. He became friends with future President Bill Clinton when both were Rhodes Scholars at the University of Oxford; during his studies there he translated Nikita Khrushchev's memoirs into English.

Career

In 1972, Talbott, along with fellow Rhodes Scholar Robert Reich and friend David E. Kendall, rallied their friends Bill and Hillary Clinton to help the Texas campaign to elect George McGovern as president of the United States. In the 1980s, he was Time'''s principal correspondent on Soviet-American relations, and his work for the magazine was cited in the three Overseas Press Club Awards won by Time in the 1980s. Talbott also wrote several books on disarmament. He translated and edited Khrushchev Remembers: The Last Testament (2 volumes, 1974) by Nikita S. Khrushchev.

Following Bill Clinton's election as president, Talbott served in the U.S. government. He was appointed Ambassador-at-Large and Special Adviser to the Secretary of State Warren Christopher on the New Independent States from 1993 to 1994, to mitigate the consequences of the Soviet breakup. He was then appointed to the second highest ranking position in the U.S. State Department as Deputy Secretary of State from 1994 to 2001. After leaving government, he was briefly the Director of the Yale Center for the Study of Globalization.

 

Talbott was the sixth president of the Brookings Institution in Washington from 2002 to 2017. He helped raise more than $650 million in support of independent policy research and analysis. At Brookings, he was responsible for formulating policies, recommending projects, approving publications and selecting staff, focusing on Eastern Europe, Russia, and nuclear arms control.  On January 31, 2017, Talbott announced his resignation from the Brookings Institution. The resignation was later retracted, but in October 2017, he was succeeded by General John R. Allen.

In December 2011, Talbott returned to government service as chair of the U.S. State Department’s Foreign Affairs Policy Board. He was on the advisory board of the DC non-profit America Abroad Media and holds leadership positions in other organizations such as the Aspen Institute and the American Academy of Diplomacy.

Family
Talbott married Brooke Shearer in 1971. He had been the college room mate of her brother, Derek. Brooke was a personal aide to Hillary Clinton. They were married for 38 years, until her death on May 19, 2009. He has two sons, Devin and Adrian Talbott, co-founders of the now-defunct Generation Engage. In 2015, he married Barbara Lazear Ascher.

Quotes
"In the next century, nations as we know it will be obsolete; all states will recognize a single, global authority. National sovereignty wasn't such a great idea after all." (Time)
"The Russians have provided an opening for renewed diplomacy. Since last summer, President Dmitry Medvedev has been calling for a 'new Euro-Atlantic security architecture'. So far, except for rehashing old complaints and the unacceptable claim that other former Soviet republics fall within Russia's 'sphere of privileged interests', Mr Medvedev and Mr Lavrov have been vague about what they have in mind.
"That creates a vacuum that the United States and its European partners can fill with their own proposals. The theme of those should be accelerating the emergence of an international system (of which NATO is a part) that is prepared to include Russia rather than exclude or contain it, and to encourage positive forces in Russia that want to see their nation integrated in a globalized world organized around the search for common solutions to common problems." (Financial Times)
"We already know that the Kremlin helped put Trump into the White House and played him for a sucker…. Trump has been colluding with a hostile Russia throughout his presidency."

Honors and awards
 Grand Officer of the Order of the Three Stars, Latvia (2012)
 Grand Cordon of the Order of the Rising Sun, Japan (2016)
 Order of the Golden Fleece (Georgia)

References

Further reading

 Finan, Bill. "Nuclear Diplomacy Up Close: Strobe Talbott on the Clinton Administration and India." India Review (Jan 2005) 4#1, pp 84-97.
 Lane, Charles. "The Master of the Game: A journey down the paper trail of Strobe Talbott: Russophile, establishmentarian, … ", The New Republic, March 7, 1994. (pp. 19–29)
Primary sources
 Talbott, Strobe. Endgame: The inside story of SALT II (1980) online
 Talbott, Strobe. Deadly Gambits: The Reagan Administration and the Stalemate in Nuclear Arms Control (1984) online
 Talbott, Strobe. The Master of the Game: Paul Nitze and the Nuclear Peace (1988) online
 Talbott, Strobe. At the Highest Levels: The Inside Story of the End of the Cold War, with Michael R. Beschloss, (1993) online
 Talbott, Strobe. The Russia Hand: A Memoir of Presidential Diplomacy (Random House, 2007). online
 Talbott, Strobe. The Great Experiment: The Story of Ancient Empires, Modern States, and the Quest for a Global Nation (2009) online
 Talbott, Strobe. Engaging India: Diplomacy, Democracy, and the Bomb'' (Brookings Institution Press, 2010). online

External links
 Strobe Talbott's Brookings Expert Page
 Talbott lecture at Ditchley Foundation, July 2010

1946 births
Living people
Alumni of Magdalen College, Oxford
American male journalists
American Rhodes Scholars
Brookings Institution people
Center on International Cooperation
Fellows of Magdalen College, Oxford
Hotchkiss School alumni
Journalists from Ohio 
Ohio Democrats
Recipients of the Order of the Cross of Terra Mariana, 1st Class
Recipients of the Order of the Golden Fleece (Georgia)
Time (magazine) people
United States Deputy Secretaries of State
Writers from Dayton, Ohio
Yale University alumni
United States Ambassadors-at-Large